Three is the third studio album by American electronic rock duo Phantogram, released October 7, 2016 by Republic Records. It was produced by band members Josh Carter and Sarah Barthel, along with Ricky Reed, John Hill, and Dan Wilson. The album was preceded by the June 2016 release of the single "You Don't Get Me High Anymore".

Background 
In the nine years until Threes release, Phantogram, a duo of Josh Carter and Sarah Barthel, transformed from an indie trip hop act to a Republic Records-signed pop act, collaborating with the likes of Miley Cyrus, Skrillex and Big Boi. In January 2016, Barthel's older sister committed suicide.

Release 
The album debuted at No. 5 on the Billboard Top Album Sales chart and No. 9 on the Billboard 200. It included the single "You Don't Get Me High Anymore", produced by Josh Carter and Reed. A series of promotional remixes of the lead single by How to Dress Well, A-Trak, Miami Horror, Attlas, and The Range were released following the album.

Track listing 

Notes
  signifies a co-producer
  signifies an additional producer
  The track incorporates string lines from the third movement, After The War, of Reich's 1988 composition Different Trains.

Personnel 
Credits adapted from Tidal.

Phantogram
 Sarah Barthel - vocals , synthesizer programming , piano , programming , synthesizer , guitar 
 Josh Carter - vocals , guitar , programming , synthesizer , percussion , drums 

Additional musicians
 Matt Chamberlain - drums 
 Darby Cicci - trumpet 
 Andrew Dunn - trombone 
 Lauren Evans - additional vocals 
 Ricky Reed - programming , synthesizer programming , guitar , percussion , bass guitar , drums , glockenspeil , synthesizer , piano 
 Dan Wilson - guitar , bass guitar , glockenspiel , piano 

Production
 Mario Borgatta - assistant mixer 
 Martin Cooke - assistant engineer 
 Rich Costey - mix engineer 
 Robin Florent - assistant mixer 
 Nicolas Fournier - assistant engineer , assistant mixer 
 Chris Galland - assistant mixer 
 Jeff Jackson - assistant mixer 
 Chris Kasych - engineer , assistant mixer 
 Manny Marroquin - mix engineer 
 Ricky Reed - executive producer
 Laura Sisk - engineer 
 Ethan Shumaker - recording engineer 

Design
 Nicolas Balcazar - cover photo
 Josh Carter - art direction, slipcover concept
 Timothy Saccenti - photography
 Joe Spix - art direction, design

Charts

References

Phantogram (band) albums
2016 albums
Republic Records albums